The 2009 Tajik League was the 17th season of Tajik League, the Tajikistan Football Federation's top division of association football. Regar-TadAZ retained their championship, having won the previous season.

Table

Top scorers

References
Season at RSSSF

Tajikistan Higher League seasons
1
Tajik
Tajik